

List of Ambassadors

Raphael Morav 2017 - 
Belaynesh Zevadia 2012 - 2017
Oded Ben-Haim 2008 - 2012
Yaacov Amitai 2005 - 2008
Doron Mordechai Grossman 2002 - 2005
Ariel Kerem 1998 - 2002
Avi Avraham Granot 1995 - 1998
Ori Noy 1993 - 1995
Haim Divon1991 - 1993
Asher Naim 1990 - 1991
Meir Joffe 1990
Hanan Einor 1981 - 1982, 1971 - 1973
Haim Ben-David 1966 - 1967
Shmuel Divon 1962 - 1966

References

Ethiopia
Israel